Roberto Fabbriciani (born 13 June 1949 in Arezzo) is an Italian flautist and composer, best known for having invented the hyperbass flute. Since 1976, he has appeared on the recordings of composers Luigi Nono, Claudio Abbado, Luciano Berio, Riccardo Chailly, and Peter Eötvös, among others and has played in the Spanish National Orchestra, the London Sinfonietta, and the orchestra of the Accademia Nazionale di Santa Cecilia.

References 

1949 births
Living people
Italian flautists